Daniel Nešpor (born 28 September 1987) is a Czech football player who currently plays for Vlašim.

References

1987 births
Living people
Czech footballers
Czech First League players
1. FC Slovácko players
Bohemians 1905 players

Association football defenders